Aliabad-e Kerend (also Romanized as ‘Alīābād-e Kerend; also known as ‘Alīābād and ‘Alīābād-e Ţelesm) is a village in Howmeh-ye Kerend Rural District, in the Central District of Dalahu County, Kermanshah Province, Iran. At the 2006 census, its population was 39, in 7 families.

References 

Populated places in Dalahu County